Tommaso Gabrielli (born 13 October 1992) is an Italian motorcycle racer who has competed in the 125cc World Championship and the FIM Superstock 1000 Cup. His brother, Matteo Gabrielli, is also a motorcycle racer.

Career statistics

Grand Prix motorcycle racing

By season

Races by year
(key)

References

External links
 Profile on MotoGP.com
 Profile on WorldSBK.com

Italian motorcycle racers
Living people
1992 births
People from Bassano del Grappa
125cc World Championship riders
FIM Superstock 1000 Cup riders
Sportspeople from the Province of Vicenza